A Great hall is the main room of a royal palace, nobleman's castle or large manor house.

Great Hall may also refer to:
 Great Hall of the People, Tiananmen Square, Beijing
 Great Hall of the University of Sydney, Australia
 Cooper Union's Foundation Building's Great Hall, New York
 Volkshalle (Große Halle) the domed architectural centerpiece of the planned, but never built, renewal of the German capital Berlin during the Nazi period

Architectural disambiguation pages